Duncan Ellis was a Canadian football player who played for the Hamilton Tiger-Cats. He won the Grey Cup with them in 1953. He previously attended and played football at the University of Toronto. He later founded and coached the football program at Eastview  Secondary School in Barrie, Ontario.

Duncan Ellis died on April 9, 2020.

References

Year of birth missing (living people)
Hamilton Tiger-Cats players
Living people
Players of Canadian football from Ontario
Toronto Varsity Blues football players
University of Toronto alumni